is a passenger railway station in located in the city of Owase, Mie Prefecture, Japan, operated by Central Japan Railway Company (JR Tōkai).

Lines

Station layout
Owase Station consists of two opposed side platforms connected to the station building by a footbridge. The station has a Midori no Madoguchi staffed ticket office.

Platforms

History
The JGR became the Japan National Railways (JNR) after World War II, and the line was extended to Kuki Station by 12 January 1957. The line was renamed the Kisei Main Line on 15 July 1959, at which time the name of the station assumed its present spelling. The station was absorbed into the JR Central network upon the privatization of the JNR on 1 April 1987.

Passenger statistics
In fiscal 2019, the station was used by an average of 379 passengers daily (boarding passengers only).

Surrounding area
Nakamurayama Castle
Owase City Hall

See also
List of railway stations in Japan

References

External links

  JR Central station information 

Railway stations in Japan opened in 1934
Railway stations in Mie Prefecture
Owase, Mie